"Kamikaze" is a song by American rapper Eminem from his album of the same name (2018).<ref>{{Cite web |url=https://www.cbsnews.com/news/kamikaze-new-eminem-album-surprise-venom-movie-single/ |title=Eminem Drops Surprise Album "Kamikaze |last=Park |first=Andrea |date=September 1, 2018 |publisher=CBS News}}</ref> The song was written and produced by Eminem and Tim Suby, with more writing credits going to DJ Bobcat, Muffla, and LL Cool J for the sampling of the latter's "I'm Bad".

Release
The song was released on August 31, 2018 with the rest of Kamikaze''.

When the album was first released, the title of this and "Fall" were misplaced, but this mistake was quickly fixed.

Personnel
Eminem – lead vocals, additional production
Tim Suby – production

Charts

Certifications

References

2018 songs
Songs written by Eminem
Songs written by LL Cool J
Songs written by DJ Bobcat
Eminem songs
Song recordings produced by Eminem